Alfred Baxter (5 June 1898 – 8 January 1983) was a British weightlifter. He competed at the 1924 and 1928 Summer Olympics in the featherweight category (under 60 kg) and finished in 7th and 19th place, respectively.

References

1898 births
1983 deaths
Olympic weightlifters of Great Britain
Weightlifters at the 1924 Summer Olympics
Weightlifters at the 1928 Summer Olympics
People from Saddleworth
British male weightlifters
Sportspeople from Yorkshire
20th-century British people